During the 2017–18 season, CD Leganés participated in La Liga for the second time in their history, and the Copa del Rey.

Squad

Transfers
List of Spanish football transfers summer 2017#Leganés

In

Out

Pre-season and friendlies

|}

Competitions

Overall

Liga

League table

Matches

Copa del Rey

Round of 32

Round of 16

Quarter-finals

Semi-finals

Statistics

Appearances and goals
Last updated on 22 December 2017.

|-
! colspan=14 style=background:#dcdcdc; text-align:center|Goalkeepers

|-
! colspan=14 style=background:#dcdcdc; text-align:center|Defenders

|-
! colspan=14 style=background:#dcdcdc; text-align:center|Midfielders

|-
! colspan=14 style=background:#dcdcdc; text-align:center|Forwards

|-
! colspan=14 style=background:#dcdcdc; text-align:center| Players who have made an appearance or had a squad number this season but have left the club
|-

|}

Cards
Accounts for all competitions. Last updated on 22 December 2017.

Clean sheets
Last updated on 22 December 2017.

References

CD Leganés seasons
CD Leganés